The Nonante-Cinq Tour is the second ongoing concert tour by Belgian singer Angèle in support of her second studio album, Nonante-Cinq (2021). The tour is visiting cities in France, Spain, Switzerland, Canada, the United States, the United Kingdom, the Netherlands and the singer's home country, Belgium. Dates were officially announced on 27 October 2021 and tickets went on sale 2 days later. The run of shows began on 20 April 2022 at the Reims Arena in Reims, and is set to conclude on 26 May 2023 in Amsterdam.

Background 
On October 27, 2021, Angèle announced the Nonante-Cinq Tour via her Twitter account. An announcement about tickets going on sale was posted on the singer's Instagram two days after the initial announcement. The then announced tour was originally announced to have 24 dates and was supposed to conclude on December 12, 2022, but four more dates in Brussels and a new date in Antwerp were added due to high demand. Three festival appearances were also announced to be part of the tour, adding an additional three dates in Barcelona, Aix-les-Bains, and Nîmes.

Setlist 
This set list is representative of the show on 20 April 2022 in Reims. It is not representative of all concerts for the duration of the tour.
{{Div col|content=#"Plus de sens"
"Tu me regardes"
"Pensées positives”
"Oui ou non"
”Tout oublier"
"On s'habitue"
"Profite"
"Solo"
"Ta reine"
"Perdus"
"Les Matins"
”Jalousie"
"Tempête"
"Taxi"
"Flemme"
"Mauvais rêves"
"Libre"
"La Loi de Murphy" / "Je veux tes yeux"
"Flou"
"Fever"
"Balance ton quoi"
"Démons"
Encore
"Bruxelles je t'aime"}}

Shows

References 

2022 concert tours
2023 concert tours